Federico Ceccherini (born 11 May 1992) is an Italian professional footballer who plays as a centre back for Serie A club Hellas Verona.

Club career
On 12 July 2018, Ceccherini signed with Fiorentina.

On 5 October 2020, he joined Hellas Verona on a season-long loan. Verona held an obligation to purchase his rights if certain conditions were met.

Career statistics

External links

References

Living people
1992 births
Italian footballers
Association football defenders
Serie A players
Serie B players
Serie D players
U.S. Pistoiese 1921 players
U.S. Livorno 1915 players
F.C. Crotone players
ACF Fiorentina players
Hellas Verona F.C. players